Atech Grand Prix was a British motor racing team.

It was formed in 2007 as Hitech Junior Team by David Hayle, who had sold his successful British Formula 3 team Hitech Racing to Austrian businessman Walter Grubmuller, Sr.

It was renamed Atech Grand Prix at the end of 2009.

The team ran Nick Yelloly, Marlon Stockinger and Tamás Pál Kiss in the 2010 Formula Renault UK Championship, with Pál Kiss challenging for the title until the final round.

2011 saw them run under the Atech Reid GP banner in the 2011 Formula Renault 2.0 UK Championship, after a new collaboration with Reid Motorsport. Former British Formula Ford Championship driver Tio Ellinas raced for them.

In 2013, they were purchased by Bamboo Engineering.

Results

GP3

In detail 
(key) (Races in bold indicate pole position) (Races in italics indicate fastest lap)

References

External links
 

British auto racing teams
Auto racing teams established in 2007
2007 establishments in the United Kingdom
GP3 Series teams
Formula Renault Eurocup teams
Superleague Formula teams
International Formula Masters teams
British Formula Renault teams
Auto racing teams disestablished in 2013